Trey Hendrickson (born December 5, 1994) is an American football defensive end for the Cincinnati Bengals of the National Football League (NFL). He played college football at Florida Atlantic, and was drafted in the third round of the 2017 NFL Draft by the New Orleans Saints.

College career
Hendrickson attended and played college football at FAU from 2013 to 2016.

Professional career
Coming out of Florida Atlantic, Hendrickson was projected by the majority of NFL draft experts and scouts to be a third or fourth round pick. On January 21, 2017, he attended the 2017 East-West Shrine Game and recorded a strip/sack. He was named the Defensive Player of the Game but lost with the East to the West 10–3. He received an invitation to the NFL combine and completed nearly all of the required combine drills but chose to skip the bench press. His time in the 40-yard dash (4.65), tied for seventh among all defensive linemen. On March 30, 2017, Hendrickson participated at Florida Atlantic's pro day, had 18 reps on the bench press, and performed positional drills. 27 NFL teams had scouts and team representatives attend to scout Hendrickson and ten other prospects. He was ranked as the 13th best defensive end prospect in the draft by NFLDraftScout.com.

New Orleans Saints

The New Orleans Saints selected Hendrickson in the third round with the 103rd overall pick in the 2017 NFL Draft, using a third round pick originally acquired from the New England Patriots in exchange for Brandin Cooks.

On June 2, 2017, the New Orleans Saints signed Hendrickson to a four-year, $3.17 million contract that includes a signing bonus of $706,288.

He competed with Darryl Tapp, Alex Okafor, Obum Gwacham, Al-Quadin Muhammad, and Alex Jenkins throughout training camp for the role as the starting defensive end. Head coach Sean Payton named him the backup defensive end to Cameron Jordan and Alex Okafor to begin the regular season.

He was unable to appear in the Saints' season-opening 29–19 loss to the Minnesota Vikings due to an illness. On September 17, 2017, Hendrickson made his professional regular season debut against the New England Patriots and recorded three combined tackles in the Saints' 36–20 loss. The following week, he earned two combined tackles and sacked Carolina Panthers' quarterback Cam Newton during a 34–13 victory. In a Week 6 matchup against the Detroit Lions, he made two pass deflections as the Saints won 52–38.

In the 2018 season, Hendrickson appeared in five games in the regular season and recorded eight combined tackles and four quarterback hits.

In the 2019 regular season opener for the Saints, Hendrickson recorded two sacks against the Houston Texans on Monday Night Football. He totaled 4.5 sacks, 19 total tackles, and one forced fumble in the 2019 season.

In Week 9 of the 2020 season against the Tampa Bay Buccaneers on Sunday Night Football, Hendrickson recorded two sacks on Tom Brady during the 38–3 win.
In Week 15 against the Kansas City Chiefs, Hendrickson recorded two sacks on Patrick Mahomes, including a strip sack that was recovered by the Saints, during the 32–29 loss.

Cincinnati Bengals
On March 19, 2021, Hendrickson signed a four-year, $60 million contract with the Cincinnati Bengals. In his first season with the team, he was named to his first Pro Bowl and set a new club record with a personal best 14 sacks,  while leading the Bengals to their third Super Bowl appearance in team history.

In Week 3 of the 2022 season, Hendrickson had four tackles, 2.5 sacks, and two forced fumbles in a 27-12 win over the New York Jets, earning AFC Defensive Player of the Week.

NFL career statistics

Regular season

Postseason

Personal life
Hendrickson was raised by his parents Collie and Louise Hendrickson. His father played football at Missouri Southern State University. During his time at Florida Atlantic, he majored in criminal justice.

Hendrickson married his wife, Alisa Chernomashentsev, on July 5, 2020. Hendrickson is a Christian.

Hendrickson is a supporter of the humanitarian aid and disaster relief organization Matthew 25: Ministries.

References

External links
Cincinnati Bengals bio
Florida Atlantic Owls bio

Living people
1994 births
American football defensive ends
Cincinnati Bengals players
Florida Atlantic Owls football players
New Orleans Saints players
People from Apopka, Florida
Players of American football from Florida
Sportspeople from Orange County, Florida
American Conference Pro Bowl players